Let's Get Married is a 2015 Chinese romantic comedy directed by Liu Jiang. It was released on April 2, 2015.

Cast
Gao Yuanyuan as Ye Wen Wen
Jiang Wu as Chen Zhen Xuan
Li Chen as Luca
Zheng Kai as Xiao Ling
Ivy Chen as Gu Xiao Lei
Bea Hayden as Wen Yi
Liu Tao as Haixin
Wang Zijian as Dapeng
Ming Dao
Sa Rina
Zhang Duo
Ryan Zuo
Monica Mok
Tu Honggang
Ying Zhuang
Jerry
Fan Ming
Jiang Ping
Wang Tong
Liu Tianchi

Production 
The film was shot in China (Beijing, Shenzhen) and Italy (Rome, Matera).

Box office
As of April 19, 2015, it has earned US$45.42 million at the Chinese box office.

References

External links

2015 romantic comedy films
Chinese romantic comedy films
Heyi Pictures films
Films shot in Matera
Films scored by Nathan Wang
Perfect World Pictures films